Tristan Danique "Dani" van den Heuvel (born 28 May 2003) is a Dutch footballer who plays as a goalkeeper for the youth academy of Leeds United.

Career

Club career

In 2020, van den Heuvel joined the youth academy of English Premier League side Leeds.

International

He is eligible to represent Indonesia internationally through his parents.

References

External links

 

2003 births
Association football goalkeepers
Dutch expatriate footballers
Dutch expatriate sportspeople in England
Dutch footballers
Dutch people of Indonesian descent
Expatriate footballers in England
Footballers from Delft
Living people
Netherlands youth international footballers